Adrian Bower (born 20 August 1970) is an English actor, best known for his role as physical education and geography teacher Brian Steadman in the first three series of the British comedy series Teachers. In 2015, he played Leofric in The Last Kingdom, a British television drama adapted from Bernard Cornwell's historical novels series The Saxon Stories.

Born in Chester, Cheshire, England, he studied drama at Guildhall School of Music and Drama, London.

Mother - Gwyneth Bower, Chester. Born 1943

He was the winner of the third series of Celebrity Poker Club, using the nickname "The Tower" in relation to his 6'4" height.

Other television work includes the first series of Gimme Gimme Gimme, the ITV drama series Talk to Me and the 2005 remake of The Quatermass Experiment, which was transmitted live on BBC Four. He also guest-starred in Dirty Filthy Love, Monroe and Rev. and played John Lennon's best friend Pete Shotton in the BBC4 drama Lennon Naked.

Bower's theatre credits include: Andy in Brassed Off (Royal National Theatre), Heracles in Simon Armitage's adaptation of Euripides classic Mr Heracles (West Yorkshire Playhouse), Steve in Celebration (Chichester) and Dan in Hotel in Amsterdam (Donmar Warehouse). He also played opposite John Simm in Elling at the Trafalgar Studios, Lovbourg in Hedda Gate Theatre.

Bower also played Greg in the Sky Living comedy-drama Mount Pleasant and DC Harihan in Charlie Brooker's A Touch of Cloth.

References

1970 births
English male actors
Living people